Black Star Mersch is a basketball team based in Mersch, Luxembourg. The team was founded in 1934 and plays in the Nationale 2, Luxembourg's second-tier league. The team previously played in the Total League, where they won championships in 1966 and 1968.

Honors
Nationale 1
Winners (2): 1965–66, 1967–68

European competitions

External links
Official website
Eurobasket.com team profile
2018/19 season schedule

Mersch
Basketball teams in Luxembourg